Die neuen Leiden des jungen W. (The New Sufferings of Young W.) is an analytic collage-style novel (montage novel) and play by Ulrich Plenzdorf.

History 
Plenzdorf wrote  Die neuen Leiden des jungen W. using the East German (DDR) youth's slang of the 1970s as a societal critique. It tells the story of a young man, who wants to escape from his small middle class environment. Reading Johann Wolfgang von Goethe's Sorrows of Young Werther, he discovers similarities between himself and the book's protagonist. The debut performance was on 18 May 1972 in Halle (Saale) with Reinhard Straube in the main role. It was a big success in the DDR. Subsequently it was also successfully performed in West Germany (BRD). In 1976 the play was made into a film in West Germany by Eberhard Itzenplitz.

Summary 

Edgar Wibeau's father left when Edgar was five. After Edgar's death at the age of 17, his father wants to know who his son was and begins interviewing people who knew him.

Raised by his mother during the GDR-era, Edgar is a good son and an excellent student. After an argument with his apprenticeship supervisor, Flemming, however, he rejects authority and leaves his hometown of Mittenberg and, with his friend Willi, moves to Berlin, where he feels he can be free to follow his own desires.

Discovered by chance, Goethe's book about Werther (whom Edgar often calls, in original English, "Old Werther") becomes a verbal weapon Edgar uses to solve inconvenient situations. The young rebel isn't successful as an artist and thinks that he's underestimated by the people a bit.

He starts working as a house painter. His co-workers Addi and Zaremba dream of a revolutionary invention, a nebula-free paint duster, but fail to put their plan into practice. Edgar secretly tries to build the machine by himself at his alcove. As soon as he tries out his prototype for the first time, he is killed by the voltage.  Whether this death was intentional or not is left for the reader to decide.

Originally, Plenzdorf wanted the protagonist to kill himself, but suicide was not an acceptable theme in the GDR.

Structure 

In the beginning of the plot Edgar is already dead. The story begins shortly after the publishing of the death notices, when the father visits the mother's flat, where she raised Edgar without a husband. The father tries to find out more about Edgar, to "get to know" him. He talks to Willi, Charlie, Addi. Although Edgar is already dead, he makes long monologues on the things his friends mention - but only the reader can hear him. Edgar illustrates his inner feelings by quoting Goethe on music tapes to Willi.

Roles 

Edgar Wibeau: Edgar is the main character. He calls himself an underestimated genius; he is a 17-year-old descendant of the Huguenots who runs away after injuring his apprenticeship taskmaster. In reality, Edgar is already dead, but he still talks to the reader about everything and everyone. He's a would-be artist who becomes a house painter after being refused by the school of arts. He was an honest child (didn't participate in tricks) and a good pupil, because his mother raised him like that after his father left the family when Edgar was 5. He becomes a typical rebel who doesn’t acquiesce in anything and doesn’t accept advice from other people. He’s in love with Charlie but doesn’t undergo much pain because of her – he has no chance of winning her over and he knows it. Despite his seemingly good and intellectual mind, it is obvious that Edgar is still childish and has a lack of experience.

Charlie: Charlie never knows what to think about Edgar. She fails to recognize his character. She likes Edgar, but not his lifestyle. She is a "strong" woman, who cannot easily be abused or be played by others (even by her fiancé, Dieter). Sometimes the reader is led to believe that Charlie has the desire to be unfaithful to Dieter with Edgar, but she only kisses Edgar. Being attractive, intelligent and friendly, but also ignorant, argumentative and somewhat arrogant, she’s an ambivalent figure.

Dieter: Dieter is an NVA soldier (Innendienstleiter, i.e., First Sergeant) who is just at the end of his enlistment and goes on to live as a student of the German language and literature on an Army stipend. He is described as a person who is, by conviction, decent to the point of boring, and makes a loving companion to Charlie; Edgar respects this, while rejecting such an attitude for himself (as Werther did) as never capable of real greatness. Attempts to be charming amuse Edgar; their effects on Charlie remain unnoted. The reader is led to believe that Edgar and Dieter would probably have been friends – had there not been Charlie between them.

Father: Edgar‘s father isn’t very young anymore. He is rather rich and lives in a penthouse with his young girlfriend. He left his wife and Edgar and doesn’t seem to care about his son until after the boy's death. However, it seems he feels little remorse for his estrangement from his ex-wife and son. 

Mother: Mrs. Wibeau doesn't display a great deal of affection for Edgar, but demands a lot from him – Edgar feels pressured to be honest and become a model student. Although she loves Edgar and supports him as much as possible, after Edgar runs away, she seemingly doesn't care about him – but wants Willi to tell her about Edgar’s whereabouts.

Adolf (Addi): The chief of the group of house painters. Seemingly acerbic, but a generally agreeable man. Edgar describes him as a "Steher" (stander, standing man, a man who stands upright - a "stand up guy" in American English). The word "Steher" suggests Edgar holds Adolf in high regard. Although Addi and Edgar disagree frequently, they seem to get along. After Edgar gets kicked out of the group, Adolf feels a sense of guilt which still persists after Edgar’s death.

Zaremba: Edgar admires Zaremba, particularly because of his being, despite his age, fit and active. The house painter is very diplomatic and often solves arguments by singing Communist songs loudly.

Willi: Willi is one of Edgar's childhood friends, the only person with whom he still has contact. The reader doesn’t learn much about Willi; they communicate via the Werther tapes.

Literature 
 Die neuen Leiden des jungen W. - play in 2 parts. [Theatre-]Manuscript. Berlin: Henschelverlag, Dept. Plays, 1972, 78 pages
 Die neuen Leiden des jungen W. 2. print, Rostock: Hinstorff, 1973, 108 pages

External links 
 Ein Werther der DDR, article by Georg Jäger (German)
 Werther in der DDR. Bürgerliches Erbe zwischen Sozialistischer Kulturpolitik und gesellschaftlicher Realität, article by Jürgen Scharfschwerdt (German)

Works based on The Sorrows of Young Werther
1976 German novels
German-language novels
East German plays
Novels set in Berlin
German novels adapted into films